Shariful Alam Imam Ahmed (October 30, 1925—December 13, 1971) was a participator in Bangladesh Liberation War. He is most widely remembered as the husband of "Shaheed Janani" (Mother of Martyrs) Jahanara Imam and as the father of Guerrilla fighter Shafi Imam Rumi. He is a character in Jahanara Imam's famous memoir Ekattorer Dingulee.

Biography

Sharif Imam was a Civil engineer. In 1948 he married Jahanara Imam, whom he met in Rangpur while studying at Carmichael College. They settled in Dhaka.

Role in War of Liberation 
In 1971, following the Pakistan army crackdown on 25 March, the Bangladesh Liberation War broke out. Many joined the liberation struggle, including  Imam's elder son Shafi Imam Rumi, who joined the Mukti Bahini to become a Mukti Joddha (Freedom Fighter). During the war, Imam's wife Jahanara Imam wrote a diary on her feelings about the struggle. This later became one of the most important publications about the War of Liberation.

Sharif and his friend Sajedur Rahman collected and sent money to the freedom fighters. At the end of June, 1971, Shahadat Chowdhury and Habibul Alam came to Sharif's house with a letter from Sector-2 commander Major Khaled Mosharraf. Mosharraf asked Sharif information about bridges and culverts of Bangladesh in order to hamper Pakistani occupation army's movement. Patriot Sharif used to provide detail information of the exact points where to set explosives so that the bridge will be damaged but also there will be less damage so that it can be repaired easily after the country is liberated.

His son, Rumi took part in many daring actions against Pakistan army. Unfortunately, he was to be picked up by the Pakistani army, never to be seen again. Imam and his younger son Jami, and Jami's cousin were also picked up for interrogation and were tortured. Imam returned home a broken man only to die three days before Bangladesh became free on 16 December 1971.

As Yahya Khan was set to announce mass mercy on September 5, 1971, many family relatives instated to ask mercy petition for Rumi to the government. Rumi's parents took the suggestion and thought over it but later decided to not do so because they considered it to be a dishonor to Rumi's views and ideology.

Sharif underwent a massive heart-attack on 13 December 1971, was rushed to IPGMR (popularly known as PG hospital, later renamed to BSMMU), where he died at late night because the defibrillator couldn't be used due to a blackout being carried out as an official Indo-Pak war had started a week ago.

Citations

References
 

1925 births
1971 deaths
Mukti Bahini personnel